Tinchlik may refer to the following places in Uzbekistan:

Tinchlik, Fergana Region, a city in Fergana Region
Tinchlik, Navoiy, a town in Navoiy Region
Tinchlik (Tashkent Metro), a metro station in Tashkent